Florence Ada Mary Lamb Polson (1877–1941) was a New Zealand rural women's advocate. She was born in Aberfeldy, Victoria, Australia.

Florence helped found the Women's Division of the New Zealand Farmers' Union and became its first president from 1925 to 1929.

References

1877 births
1941 deaths
Australian emigrants to New Zealand
New Zealand feminists